Orthogonius alternans is a species of ground beetle in the subfamily Orthogoniinae. It was described by Wiedemann in 1823.

References

alternans
Beetles described in 1823